Mark Kyle Salyards (born December 17, 1980) is an American former competition swimmer who participated in the 2000 Summer Olympics in Sydney, Australia.  He competed in the men's 200-meter breaststroke, and finished sixth in the event final with a time of 2:13.27.

See also
 List of Olympic medalists in swimming (men)
 List of University of Georgia people

References

1980 births
Living people
American male breaststroke swimmers
Georgia Bulldogs men's swimmers
Olympic swimmers of the United States
Sportspeople from Lancaster, Pennsylvania
Swimmers at the 2000 Summer Olympics
Pan American Games gold medalists for the United States
Pan American Games medalists in swimming
Swimmers at the 2003 Pan American Games
Medalists at the 2003 Pan American Games